Rattlesnake Creek is a tributary,  long, of Crooked Creek in the U.S. state of Oregon. The creek, which is intermittent, begins in the desert north of McDermitt in Malheur County.

See also
 List of rivers of Oregon
 List of longest streams of Oregon

References

Rivers of Oregon
Rivers of Malheur County, Oregon